The International Arctic Research Center, or IARC, established in 1999, is a research institution focused on integrating and coordinating study of Climate change in the Arctic. The primary partners in IARC are Japan and the United States. Participants include organizations from Canada, China, Denmark, Germany, Japan, Norway, Russia, the United Kingdom, and the United States.

Overview
The Center is located at the University of Alaska Fairbanks, in the Syun-Ichi Akasofu Building. The Keith B. Mather Library is the science library housed in the Akasofu Building, serving IARC and the Geophysical Institute of UAF. The building also houses the UAF atmospheric sciences department, the Center for Global Change and the Fairbanks forecast office of the National Weather Service.

Study projects are focused within four major themes:
 Arctic ocean models and observation
 Arctic atmosphere: feedbacks, radiation, and weather analysis
 Permafrost/Frozen soil models and observations
 Arctic biota/vegetation (ecosystem models)

IARC is devoting specific effort to answering the following three questions:
To what extent is climate change due to natural vs man-made causes? 
What parameters, processes and interactions are needed to understand and predict future climate change? 
What are the likely impacts of climate change?

References

External links
 IARC official website
 Keith B. Mather Library website

1999 establishments in Alaska
International research institutes
Japan in non-Japanese culture
Systems ecology
Arctic research
Research institutes in Alaska
Science and technology in Alaska
University of Alaska Fairbanks